Ramon L. Guzman (born September 28, 1982) is a former gridiron football linebacker. He played for the Montreal Alouettes of the Canadian Football League. He was signed by the Indianapolis Colts as an undrafted free agent in 2007. He played college football at Buffalo.

On May 7, 2012, he was released by the Alouettes.

References

External links
Indianapolis Colts bio
Montreal Alouettes bio
Just Sports Stats

1982 births
Living people
Sportspeople from the Bronx
Players of American football from New York City
American football linebackers
American football defensive ends
American players of Canadian football
Canadian football linebackers
Buffalo Bulls football players
Indianapolis Colts players
Montreal Alouettes players